Reza Bahmaei (born 24 September 1994) is an Iranian football forward who played for Esteghlal Ahvaz in the Iran Pro League.

Club career
Khaziravi joined Esteghlal Ahvaz in summer 2015, after graduating from Foolad Academy. He made his professional debut on September 26, 2015 against Gostaresh Foulad where he was used as a starter.

Club career statistics

References

External links
 Reza Bahmaei at IranLeague.ir

1994 births
Living people
Iranian footballers
Esteghlal Ahvaz players
Association football forwards